Jack Delaney (March 19, 1900 – November 27, 1948) was a world light heavyweight boxing champion  and contender for the heavyweight crown. One of the most popular fighters of the 1920s, the French Canadian was born Ovila Chapdelaine in Saint-François-du-Lac, Quebec, Canada. His parents moved their family to the United States on August 15, 1904, where they initially lived in Holyoke, Massachusetts before settling in Bridgeport, Connecticut. Delaney became a United States Citizen on October 23, 1936.

Reputation
Delaney was known for his beautiful, seemingly flawless movements in the ring. He was an accomplished boxer with a smooth and quick left hand. In addition he had one-punch knockout power in his right hand. Early in his career he broke both his hands and seemed through. His contract was purchased by Pete Reilly for 900 dollars, who promptly promoted Delaney into an attraction worth a half million dollars.

Early career
In 1924, Delaney decisioned future light heavyweight champion Tommy Loughran, and less than a month later, in Madison Square Garden, Delaney first faced the hard punching Paul Berlenbach. In a great fight that saw both men knocked to the canvas, Delaney scored two knockdowns in the fourth round, causing the referee to stop the fight.

Delaney was also involved in a bizarre match with future middleweight champion Tiger Flowers. After a round had passed, Delaney floored Flowers with a straight right hand. The referee counted Flowers out, but his corner protested that he had received a "fast count". The Flowers faction became unruly and a riot seemed imminent. Flowers demanded that the match resume, and Delaney amazingly agreed. The two fought until the fourth round, when Delaney again fired an irresistible right hand that knocked Flowers senseless. This time there was no controversy, as Flowers did not come close to arising in time. When Flowers did come to, he went to Delaney's dressing room and said "Ah want to thank you, Mr. Delaney, and tell you that Ah is convinced."

Championships
Delaney was rewarded with a title shot against light heavyweight champion Berlanbach, in a 15-round fight, co-promoted by Roderick James "Jess" McMahon and Tex Rickard. In an outstanding display of courage, perseverance and fortitude, Berlanbach upset Delaney by winning a 15-round decision. Delaney then embarked on an eleven-fight winning streak that led to a rematch. The fight was held in Brooklyn's Ebbets Field and spurred on by his loudly cheering female fans, known as "Delaney's screaming mamies," Delaney dropped Berlenbach, controlled the fight and won the light heavyweight title.

Early in 1927, Delaney relinquished his championship in order to pursue the heavyweight crown. He was matched against Jimmy Maloney, a journeyman heavyweight contender Delaney was expected to defeat handily. Had Delaney defeated Maloney, he would have faced the heavyweight champion Gene Tunney.

Preparation
Delaney always prepared for fights in secluded training camps, in idyllic settings where no liquor was allowed on the premises. Unknown to the fans and sportswriters of the day was the reason for the no liquor rules; Delaney drank. He just didn't drink socially, but would disappear on benders lasting days. Before the Maloney fight, Delaney disappeared on a three-day toot. Unknown to his manager, sometime during the three days, Delaney threw a punch at a railroad porter. The porter ducked, and Delaney hit the steel side of the rail car, breaking his hand. He told no one of his injury and fought Maloney, anyway. Unable to throw his right, Delaney dropped the 10-round decision.

Obstacles
By this time, Delaney's drinking had become a major obstacle in his career. In his last big fight he was matched with future heavyweight champion Jack Sharkey. Once again, the possibility of a crack at the heavyweight crown, and a big gate with Tunney, was in the balance. This time Delaney entered the ring flabby, bloated and listless. When the bell rang for the opening round he was unable to move. Apparently intoxicated to the point of virtual paralysis, Delaney stood staring at his corner as Sharkey came across the ring. Sharkey paused momentarily in disbelief, and then knocked Delaney to the canvas. The fight ended with Delaney on his hands and knees, crawling around the ring like a man looking for a lost button, while the referee counted him out. The emotional Sharkey, his mouth piece hanging halfway out of his mouth, clung to the top ring rope crying in joy, as the furious spectators cried fix.

Retirement
Delaney retired with a record of 77 wins (44 KOs), 12 losses, and 2 draws, 2 No Decisions and 2 No Contests. After his boxing career he operated a number of businesses, ran a tavern in New York and refereed. He died of cancer in 1948.

Professional boxing record
All information in this section is derived from BoxRec, unless otherwise stated.

Official record

All newspaper decisions are officially regarded as “no decision” bouts and are not counted in the win/loss/draw column.

Unofficial record

Record with the inclusion of newspaper decisions in the win/loss/draw column.

See also
List of light heavyweight boxing champions

References

External links

Jack Delaney - CBZ Profile

1900 births
1948 deaths
Canadian male boxers
Heavyweight boxers